Deadlock Pro-Wrestling (DPW) is an American independent promotion, founded on November 1, 2021, by Anthony Douglas, James Darnell and John Blud. On December 11, DPW taped their first show, DPW Fire, which aired five days later on YouTube. Since then, episodes of Fire and DPW Spark has aired on DPW's YouTube channel.

History
On November 1, the formation of DPW was announced. On December 11, DPW taped their first show, DPW Fire, which aired on December 16. The first episode of Fire introduced a tournament to crown the first DPW Worlds Champion.

On January 8, 2022, DPW produced the first internet pay-per-view named You Already Know, which aired on January 15, where Bojack defeated Andrew Everett in the tournament finals to become the inaugural world champion. On April 16, at DPW Forever, The Reality (Chance Rizer and Patrick Scott) became the first DPW Tag Team Champions. On June 10, Calvin Tankman became the inaugural national champion, and on August 6, Raychell Rose became the inaugural women's world champion.

On January 14, 2023, DPW held their first live PPV event name DPW Live 1: Ali vs KENTo.

Championships and accomplishments

Championship history

DPW National Championship

The DPW National Championship is the company's secondary championship. Calvin Tankman was the inaugural champion. The current champion is Andrew Everett, in his first reign, who defeat Tankman at DPW 1st Anniversary.

DPW National Championship Tournament (2022)

DPW Worlds Tag Team Championship

DPW Women's Worlds Championship

The DPW Women's Worlds Championship is a women's professional wrestling world championship. Raychell Rose was the inaugural champion. The current champion is Emi Sakura, in her first reign, who defeat Rose at DPW 1st Anniversary.

DPW Women's Worlds Championship Tournament (2022)

References

External links
Official DPW website

American professional wrestling promotions
American independent professional wrestling promotions
2021 establishments in North Carolina
Independent professional wrestling promotions based in the Midwestern United States
Independent professional wrestling promotions based in North Carolina
Companies based in North Carolina